Lee Vining Peak is an 11,690-foot-elevation (3,563 meter) summit located in the Sierra Nevada mountain range, in Mono County of northern California, United States. The mountain is set within the Hoover Wilderness, on land managed by Inyo National Forest.

History

The mountain's toponym was officially adopted by the United States Board on Geographic Names to honor Leroy Vining, an early pioneer who in 1852 established a small mining camp that would later become the town of Lee Vining, California, which is five miles east-southeast of the peak. His life ended in 1863 at the Exchange Saloon in Aurora, Nevada, where he accidentally shot himself in the groin with the pistol in his pocket. In 1901 the name was adopted as "Leevining Peak", and in 1955 the board changed it to "Lee Vining Peak."

Climate
Lee Vining Peak is located in an alpine climate zone. Most weather fronts originate in the Pacific Ocean, and travel east toward the Sierra Nevada mountains. As fronts approach, they are forced upward by the peaks (orographic lift), causing moisture in the form of rain or snowfall to drop onto the range. Precipitation runoff from this mountain drains to Mono Lake.

See also

 List of mountain peaks of California

Gallery

References

External links
 Weather forecast: Lee Vining Peak

Mountains of Mono County, California
North American 3000 m summits
Mountains of Northern California
Sierra Nevada (United States)
Inyo National Forest